Ezem (vars. ‛Atsem, 'Asam, Azem, 'Osem or Otzem, meaning strength, might, bone, to close, to defend, also self, self-same and strenuous) is an unidentified site in the Negev of Judah toward the Edomite border. 

It is mentioned in the Biblical Book of Joshua(). In the King James Version it is spelled "Azem" in Joshua and "Ezem" in Chronicles.

In Joshua 19:1-3 and 1 Chronicles 4:29 it is one of the towns "in the midst of
the inheritance of Judah" assigned to Simeon.

See also
Cities in the Book of Joshua

References

References

Hebrew Bible places